(born June 22, 1970 in Niigata) is a retired boxer from Japan, who competed for his native country at the 1992 Summer Olympics in Barcelona, Spain.

Japan sent four boxers to the Barcelona Games. Sasaki competed in the Men's Light Flyweight (– 48 kg) division. He defeated Canada's Domenic Figliomeni in the first round on points (5:3) before falling to Romania's Valentin Barbu (7:10) in the second round.

References

External links
Profile

1970 births
Living people
Flyweight boxers
Boxers at the 1992 Summer Olympics
Olympic boxers of Japan
Japanese male boxers